KH-9 (BYEMAN codename HEXAGON), commonly known as Big Bird or KeyHole-9, was a series of photographic reconnaissance satellites launched by the United States between 1971 and 1986. Of twenty launch attempts by the National Reconnaissance Office, all but one were successful. Photographic film aboard the KH-9 was sent back to Earth in recoverable film return capsules for processing and interpretation. Another source says "images in the "better-than-one-foot" category" for the last "Gambit" missions.

They are also officially known as the Broad Coverage Photo Reconnaissance satellites (Code 467), built by Lockheed Corporation for the National Reconnaissance Office (NRO).

The satellites were an important factor in determining Soviet military capabilities and in the acquisition of accurate intelligence for the formulation of U.S. national policy decisions as well as deployment of U.S. forces and weapon systems. The satellites were instrumental in U.S. National Technical Means of Verification of Strategic Arms Limitation Talks (SALT) and the Anti-Ballistic Missile Treaty (ABMT).

The KH-9 was declassified in September 2011 and an example was put on public display for a single day on 17 September 2011 in the parking lot of the Steven F. Udvar-Hazy Center of the National Air and Space Museum.

On 26 January 2012, the National Museum of the United States Air Force put a KH-9 on public display along with its predecessors the KH-7 and KH-8.

Development 
The KH-9 was originally conceived in the early 1960s as a replacement for the CORONA search satellites. The goal was to search large areas of the Earth with a medium resolution camera. The KH-9 carried two main cameras, although a mapping camera was also carried on several missions. The photographic film from the cameras was sent to recoverable re-entry vehicles and returned to Earth, where the capsules were caught in mid-air by an aircraft. Four re-entry vehicles were carried on most missions, with a fifth added for missions that included a mapping camera.

Between September 1966 and July 1967, the contractors for the Hexagon subsystems were selected. Lockheed Missiles and Space Company (LMSC) was awarded the contract for the Satellite Basic Assembly (SBA), Perkin Elmer for the primary Sensor Subsystem (SS), McDonnell for the Reentry Vehicle (RV), RCA Astro-Electronics Division for the Film Take-Up system, and Itek for the Stellar Index camera (SI). Integration and ground-testing of Satellite Vehicle-1 (SV-1) were completed in May 1971, and it was subsequently shipped to Vandenberg Air Force Base in a  container. Ultimately, four generations ("blocks") of KH-9 HEXAGON reconnaissance satellites were developed. KH9-7 (missions 7 to 12) was the first to fly a Block-II panoramic camera and SBA. Block-III (missions 13 to 18) included upgrades to electrical distribution and batteries. Two added tanks with ullage control for the Orbit Adjust System (OAS) and new thrusters for the Reaction Control System (RCS) served to increase KH-9's operational lifetime. In addition, the nitrogen supply for the film transport system and the camera vessel was increased. Block-IV (missions 19 and 20) was equipped with an extended command system using plated wire memory. In the mid 1970s, over 1,000 people in the Danbury, Connecticut area worked on the secret project.

The  retrieved its payload in April 1972 after a lengthy search, but the film had disintegrated during the nine months underwater, leaving no usable photographs.

Over the duration of the program, the lifetime of the individual satellites increased steadily. The final KH-9 operated for 275 days.

Main KH-9 components

Satellite Control Section 

The Satellite Control Section (SCS), which forms the aft part of the SBA, started as Air Force Project 467. SCS was intended as a more capable replacement for the on-orbit propulsion, which had been provided by the Agena upper stage for previous generations of reconnaissance satellites. It housed hydrazine propellant tanks for the pressure fed Orbital Adjust System (OAS) and the Reaction Control System (RCS). OAS and RCS were connected by a transfer line to facilitate propellant exchange. The tank pressure was maintained within the operational range by additional high pressure nitrogen tanks. The SCS incorporated a freon gas system for backup attitude control inherited from the Agena, commonly referred to as "lifeboat". SCS was equipped with deployable solar panels and an unfurlable parabolic antenna for high data rate communication.

Main camera 

The main camera system was designed by Perkin-Elmer to take stereo images, with a forward looking camera on the port side, and an aft looking camera on the starboard side. The system aperture is defined by a  diameter aspheric corrector plate, which corrects the spherical aberration of the Wright design. In each of the cameras the ground image passes through the corrector plate to a 45°-angle flat mirror, which reflects the light to a -diameter concave main mirror. The main mirror directs the light through an opening in the flat mirror and through a four-element lens system onto the film platen. The cameras could scan contiguous areas up to 120° wide, and achieved a ground resolution better than  during the later phase of the project.

Mapping camera 
Intended for mapmaking, photos this camera took cover essentially the entire Earth with at least some images between 1973 and 1980. Almost all the imagery from this camera, amounting to 29,000 images, each covering , was declassified in 2002 as a result of Executive order 12951, the same order which declassified CORONA, and copies of the films were transferred to the U.S. Geological Survey's Earth Resources Observation Systems office.

Scientific analysis of declassified KH-9 satellite images continues to reveal historic trends and changes in climate and terrestrial geology. A 2019 study of glacial melt in the Himalayas over the past half-century used data collected by KH-9 satellites throughout the 1970s and 1980s to demonstrate that melt rates had doubled since 1975.

The KH-9 was never a backup project for the KH-10 Manned Orbital Laboratory. It was developed solely as a replacement for the Corona search system.

Reentry vehicles 
The forward section of KH-9 housed four McDonnell Douglas Mark 8 satellite reentry vehicles (RV), which were fed film exposed by the main cameras. Each RV had an empty mass of 434 kg. It housed a film take-up assembly with a mass of 108 kg, and could store about 227 kg of film. The twelve mapping missions were equipped with an additional General Electrics Mark V RV, which could store about 32 kg of film for a total mass of 177 kg.

High-altitude atmospheric density 
Missions 1205 to 1207 carried Doppler beacons to help map the atmospheric density at high altitudes in an effort to understand the effect on ephemeris predictions. The measurements of the atmospheric density were released through NASA.

ELINT subsatellites 

Missions 1203, 1207, 1208, 1209, and 1212 to 1219 included Ferret ELINT subsatellites, which were launched into a high Earth orbit to catalogue Soviet air defence radars, eavesdrop on voice communications, and tape missile and satellite telemetry. Missions 1210 to 1212 also included scientific subsatellites.

KH-9 missions 

(NSSDC ID Numbers: See COSPAR)

Cost 

Specifications 
Data source: The Encyclopedia of US Spacecraft  and NSSDC
 Launch vehicle: Titan IIID/34D
 Total weight: , with mapping camera 
 Reentry weight:  
 Max. diameter (main body):  
 Length (with mapping camera): 
 Orbit: elliptical, 
 Scanners: television, radio, and high resolution camera

Gallery

See also 

Other U.S. imaging spy satellites:
 CORONA series:
 KH-1
 KH-2
 KH-3
 KH-4
 KH-5 Argon
 KH-6 Lanyard
 KH-7 Gambit
 KH-8 Gambit 3
 KH-10 (Manned Orbiting Laboratory)
 KH-11 Kennen
 KH-13 (Enhanced Imaging System)

References

External links 

 US Geological Survey Satellite Images: Photographic imagery from KH-7 Surveillance and KH-9 Mapping system (1963 to 1980).
 SpaceRef.com: "KH-9 Hexagon Spy Satellite Makes a Rare Public Outing (Photos and Video)"

1971 in spaceflight
Reconnaissance satellites of the United States
Surveillance
Military equipment introduced in the 1970s